Lorenzo Savadori (born 4 April 1993) is a motorcycle racer from Italy, He was the 2015 FIM Superstock 1000 Cup winner and the Italia 2020 CIV Superbike Champion, acting as test rider for Aprilia with occasional wild card race entries. For the 2021 season, he competed in the MotoGP class of racing for Aprilia Racing as team-mate to Aleix Espargaró.

Career
Savadori was born at Cesena. After finishing runner-up in the 2007 Red Bull MotoGP Rookies Cup, in 2008 he won the Italian 125GP championship and the European 125cc Championship. From 2016 to 2018 he rode for Aprilia in the Superbike World Championship with a best finish of 10th place. In  he rode for Gresini Racing in the MotoE World Cup aboard an Energica Ego Corsa. In 2020 he won the CIV Superbike championship.

MotoGP World Championship
Savadori debuted in the MotoGP class replacing Bradley Smith as the substitute for the suspended Andrea Iannone.

Career statistics

Red Bull MotoGP Rookies Cup

Races by year
(key) (Races in bold indicate pole position, races in italics indicate fastest lap)

Grand Prix motorcycle racing

By season

By class

Races by year
(key) (Races in bold indicate pole position, races in italics indicate fastest lap)

FIM Superstock 1000 Cup

Races by year
(key) (Races in bold indicate pole position, races in italics indicate fastest lap)

Superbike World Championship

Races by year
(key) (Races in bold indicate pole position, races in italics indicate fastest lap)

References

External links

 

1993 births
Living people
People from Cesena
Italian motorcycle racers
125cc World Championship riders
FIM Superstock 1000 Cup riders
Superbike World Championship riders
MotoE World Cup riders
MotoGP World Championship riders
Gresini Racing MotoGP riders
Sportspeople from the Province of Forlì-Cesena
Aprilia Racing MotoGP riders